Augustowo (Polish for "Augusta") traditionally referred to the city now known as Augustów.

It may also refer to:

Augustowo, Bydgoszcz County in Kuyavian-Pomeranian Voivodeship (north-central Poland)
Augustowo, Żnin County in Kuyavian-Pomeranian Voivodeship (north-central Poland)
Augustowo, Podlaskie Voivodeship (north-east Poland)
Augustowo, Mława County in Masovian Voivodeship (east-central Poland)
Augustowo, Wyszków County in Masovian Voivodeship (east-central Poland)
Augustowo, Grodzisk Wielkopolski County in Greater Poland Voivodeship (west-central Poland)
Augustowo, Leszno County in Greater Poland Voivodeship (west-central Poland)
Augustowo, Międzychód County in Greater Poland Voivodeship (west-central Poland)
Augustowo, Złotów County in Greater Poland Voivodeship (west-central Poland)
Augustowo, Warmian-Masurian Voivodeship (north Poland)

See also
 Augusta (disambiguation)